Fatiha Keloua-Hachi (born 5 June 1971) is a French politician from the Socialist Party (NUPES). She was elected as a deputy for Seine-Saint-Denis's 8th constituency in the 2022 French legislative election.

See also 

 List of deputies of the 16th National Assembly of France

References 

Living people
1971 births
Socialist Party (France) politicians
Members of Parliament for Seine-Saint-Denis
21st-century French politicians
21st-century French women politicians
Politicians from Paris
Women members of the National Assembly (France)
Deputies of the 16th National Assembly of the French Fifth Republic